Roads of Strategic Importance in Queensland is a list of roads in Queensland, Australia, that are the subject of one or more road improvement projects under the Roads of Strategic Importance (ROSI) initiative of the Australian Government. The purposes of this document are to:
 List the strategic corridors that are wholly or partly in Queensland, with at least one project in Queensland.
 List all ROSI projects in Queensland, and provide a link to each project description.
 List all roads and associated structures targeted by ROSI projects in Queensland.
 Record the copying of project details to associated Wikipedia articles.
 Indicate projects targeted for "early works" by the Queensland Government.



Data columns
The list is in the form of a table with the following date columns:
 Corridor name
 Project short name
 Road name
 Copied
 Notes

Corridor name
Corridor names from the source document (reference 1) are listed alphabetically without any division between Northern and Southern Australia corridors. A corridor name, "Non-corridor projects", is below the corridor names.

Project short name
Where a project short name differs from the project name in the source document it has been derived as follows:
 A road name, if included, has been removed.
 The remaining text has been rearranged.

For example "Flinders Highway (Townsville - Charters Towers) Wide Centre Line Treatment" is changed to "Wide centre line treatment Townsville-Charters Towers". 

These project short names are listed alphabetically within each corridor, so there is no relation to the sequence of project names in the source document.

Road name
Where a road name is in the project name or the project description it has been included in this column. Where there are multiple names only one has been listed in this column. The alphabetic index for the table is based on the road name.

Copied
If used by participating editors this column indicates that the details of a project have been copied to a related Wikipedia article.

Notes
In addition to miscellaneous notes this column indicates those projects targeted for "early works" by the Queensland Government, as shown in reference 2.

Table

Roads with no Wikipedia article
The following roads, each identified as the site of a ROSI project, are state-controlled roads with no Wikipedia article:
 Mundubbera–Durong Road – Regional road number 435.
 Torbanlea–Pialba Road – District road number 164, rated as a local road of regional significance (LRRS).

The following roads, each identified as the site of a ROSI project, also have no Wikipedia article:
 Arcadia Valley Road,  (Intersection only)
 Bargara Road, 
 Boundary Road, Hervey Bay
 Floraville Road, 
 Gayndah–Mount Perry Road,  (Intersection only)
 Glenmoral–Roundstone Road, 
 Quay Street, Bundaberg
 Rosedale Road,  (Intersection only)
 Salmon Road,  (Intersection only)
 Stanage Bay Road, Shoalwater Bay
 Urraween Road, Hervey Bay
 Westwood–Wowan Road, 
 Wetherton Road, Ginoondan (Intersection only)
 Willies Creek–Royles Road, 
 Winfield Road, Watalgan (Intersection only)

References 

Roads in Queensland